Shapour Azarbarzin was an Iranian fighter pilot.

The deputy commander to Amir Hossein Rabii before the Iranian Revolution, he was appointed as the commander of Air Force in  20 February 1979, and served in the capacity until the first week of March. In April 1979, Prime Minister Mehdi Bazargan offered him to hold office as the defense minister, however he refused it. Shortly after, he was briefly imprisoned by the revolutionary forces but was released after efforts made by Bazargan and left Iran in late November 1980.

References

Commanders of Islamic Republic of Iran Air Force
2015 deaths
1930 births